Cynan Garwyn was king of Powys in the north-east and east of Wales, who flourished in the second half of the 6th century. Little reliable information exists which can be used to reconstruct the background and career of the historical figure. Available materials include early Welsh poetry, genealogies and hagiography, which are often late and of uncertain value.

Putative biography

He is thought to have been a son of his predecessor Brochwel Ysgithrog and the father of Selyf Sarffgadau, who may have succeeded him. Later Welsh genealogies trace his lineage to Cadell Ddyrnllug. His epithet Garwyn, possibly Carwyn, has been explained as meaning either "of the White Thigh" or "of the White Chariot". Cynan may be the same person as Aurelius Caninus, one of the Welsh tyrants who are fiercely criticised by the mid-6th-century cleric Gildas in his De Excidio et Conquestu Britanniae, but there is also a possibility that the latter refers to Cynin ap Millo, a relative of Cynan's.

Cynan is the addressee of a poem ascribed to Taliesin, Trawsganu Kynan Garwyn Mab Brochfael, which, though first attested in the fourteenth-century Book of Taliesin, might actually date back to the sixth century. Here he is presented as a warlord who led many successful campaigns throughout Wales: on the River Wye, against the men of Gwent, on Anglesey, and in Dyfed (where his opponent in Dyfed may have been Aergul Lawhir ap Tryffin), Brycheiniog and Cornwall. Unlike his son, he is never described as having faced the English in battle.

The saints' lives highlight a more peaceful side to Cynan's reign, but as these works are late and were written to demonstrate the powers of the saints, rather little credence can be given to them. In Lifris' Life of St Cadog, abbot of Llancarfan (written c. 1100), Cynan Garwyn intends to undertake a raid against Glamorgan, whose king is so terrified that he asks the clergy of the saint's house to intercede for him. The clerics travel to Cynan and when they are halted at the River Neath, one of them climbs up a tree to approach the king from up high. The tree bends in such a way that it forms a bridge to the opposite bank of the river and having so witnessed the saint's miraculous powers, Cynan is dissuaded from his violent plans and proclaims peace on all the land. Cynan is here described as a king of Rheinwg, which may be a territory in Dyfed or on the border between modern-day Herefordshire and Brecknockshire. In the Welsh life of St Beuno, Cynan is credited for granting land at Gwyddelwern (in Edeirnion) to the saint.

Other sons beside Selyf Sarffgadau include Eiludd, who is sometimes mistaken for Selyf, and unreliable sources add Maredudd and Dinogad to the list. Some genealogies record that he married Gwenwynwyn 'of the Scots'. It is sometimes argued that he died with his son at the Battle of Chester in around 613 but any precise description would be based more on the desire to create a myth of the foundation of a dynasty or legend of Powysian glory than on available evidence.

References

Further reading

Primary sources
Winterbottom, Michael (ed. and tr.). Gildas: The ruin of Britain, and other works. 1978. 
Williams, Ifor, Sir (tr. J. E. Caerwyn Williams). The Poems of Taliesin. Mediaeval and Modern Welsh Series 3. Dublin: DIAS, 1968. Originally published in Welsh as Canu Taliesin. Cardiff, 1960.
Bromwich, R. (ed. and tr.). Trioedd ynys Prydein: the Welsh triads. 2nd edition. 1978. 
Bartrum, P.C. (ed.). Early Welsh genealogical tracts. 1966. 
Wade-Evans, A.W. Vitae Sanctorum Britanniae et Genealogiae. Cardiff: University of Wales Press, 1944.

Secondary sources
 Kari Maund (2000) The Welsh Kings: The Medieval Rulers of Wales (Tempus)
 John Edward Lloyd (1911) A history of Wales from the earliest times to the Edwardian conquest (Longmans, Green & Co.)
 Kirby, D.P. "The bards and the Welsh border." In Mercian studies, ed. A. Dornier. 1977. pp. 31–42.

External links
 

6th-century births
Monarchs of Powys
House of Gwertherion
6th-century Welsh monarchs
Year of death unknown
Taliesin